Charles Mee may refer to:

 Charles L. Mee (born 1938), American playwright, historian and author
 Charles Denis Mee (born 1927), engineer, physicist, and author